Ülkü (literally: "ideal") is a Turkish surname and a unisex given name. People with the name include:

Given name
 Ülkü Adatepe (1932–2012), youngest adopted daughter of Mustafa Kemal Atatürk
 Ülkü Azrak (1933–2020), Turkish lawyer
 Ülkü Tamer (1937-2018), Turkish poet
 Ülkü Uludoğan (born 1940), Turkish artist

Surname
 Mehmet Ülkü (1877–1946), Turkish businessman and politician
 Semra Ülkü, Turkish educator

See also
 Ülkü (magazine)

References

Turkish-language surnames
Turkish unisex given names
Surnames from nicknames